A hybrid solar eclipse occurred on June 17, 1909. A solar eclipse occurs when the Moon passes between Earth and the Sun, thereby totally or partly obscuring the image of the Sun for a viewer on Earth. A total solar eclipse occurs when the Moon's apparent diameter is larger than the Sun's, blocking all direct sunlight, turning day into darkness. Totality occurs in a narrow path across Earth's surface, with the partial solar eclipse visible over a surrounding region thousands of kilometres wide. This event was a hybrid, starting and ending as an annular eclipse.

The path of totality crossed central Russia, the Arctic Ocean, northeastern Ellesmere Island in Canada, Greenland, and annularity crossed southern Siberia in Russia (now in northeastern Kazakhstan and southern Russia) and southern Greenland.

Related eclipses

Solar eclipses 1906–1909

External links 

1909 06 17
1909 06 17
1909 in science
June 1909 events